The Attalia 32, or just Attalia, is a French sailboat that was designed by the Joubert-Nivelt design firm as a cruiser and first built in 1982.

The boat was based on the 1981 International Offshore Rule Half Ton class world champion, named Air Bigouden.

Production
The design was built by Jeanneau in France, from 1982 until 1988 with 871 boats completed, but it is now out of production.

Design
The Attalia 32 is a recreational keelboat, built predominantly of solid polyester fiberglass with a balsa-cored deck and teak wood trim. It has a masthead sloop rig, with a deck-stepped mast, a single set of unswept spreaders and aluminum spars with continuous stainless steel wire rigging. The hull has a raked stem, a reverse transom, a skeg-mounted rudder controlled by a tiller and a fixed fin keel, or optional stub keel and swing keel combination.

The fixed keel version displaces  and carries  of cast iron ballast, while the swing keel version displaces  and carries  of cast iron exterior ballast, with a steel swing keel.

The design has sleeping accommodation for six people, with a double "V"-berth in the bow cabin, an "L"-shaped settee and a straight settee in the main cabin and an aft cabin with a double berth on the port side. The galley is located on the port side just forward of the companionway ladder. The galley is "L"-shaped and is equipped with a two-burner stove, a  ice box and a double sink. A navigation station is opposite the galley, on the starboard side. The head is located just aft of the navigation station on the starboard side and includes a shower.

Operational history
Although designed for cruising, the boat has been quite successfully raced in PHRF competition.

In a 2002 review in Sailing Magazine, John Kretschmer wrote, "the Jeanneau Attalia is surprising boat. Because it hovers just off the radar screen for most U.S. sailors, it is an excellent value. The Attalia delivers comfort, performance and quality construction at a most affordable price."

See also
List of sailing boat types

References

External links

Keelboats
1980s sailboat type designs
Sailing yachts
Sailboat type designs by Joubert-Nivelt
Sailboat types built by Jeanneau